Kandor may refer to:

Places 
 Kandor, Hamadan, Iran

Other uses 
 Kandor (comics), a location of Krypton in the DC universe

See also
Candor (disambiguation)
Kandar (disambiguation)
Kondar (disambiguation)
Kondor (disambiguation)